Romundstad is a Norwegian surname. In 2015, there were 199 people with this surname in Norway. The name is originally an oeconym referring to a farm, and it is especially frequent in the municipality of Rindal.

Notable people with the surname include:
Lars Sverkeson Romundstad (1885–1961), Norwegian politician
Jens Romundstad (a.k.a. Biker-Jens; born 1970), Danish television personality

References

Norwegian-language surnames